The  Finnish Financial Supervisory Authority (FIN-FSA; in Finnish: Finanssivalvonta [Fiva]; in Swedish: Finansinspektionen [FI]) is the financial regulatory authority of the Finnish government, responsible for the regulation of financial markets in Finland.

History
The Financial Supervisory Authority (FIN-FSA) was established on 1 January 2009, following a merger of the former Financial Supervision Authority and the Insurance Supervisory Authority. FIN-FSA operates in connection with the Bank of Finland. The predecessor of the Financial Supervision Authority was the Banking Supervision Office (in Finnish: Rahoitustarkastuslaitos [Rata]; also then in Swedish: Finansinspektionen [FI]).

See also

Economy of Finland
Securities Commission
List of financial regulatory authorities by country

References

External links

Government agencies established in 2009
Finland
Government agencies of Finland